Michael David Petchey (born 16 December 1958) is an English former cricketer.

Petchey was born at Ealing in December 1958. He later studied at Christ Church, Oxford. While studying at Oxford, he made his debut in first-class cricket for Oxford University against Northamptonshire at Oxford in 1983. He played first-class cricket for Oxford until 1984, making seven appearances. Playing as a right-arm medium pace bowler, he took 16 wickets at an average of 55.37, with best figures of 4 for 65. In addition to playing first-class cricket while at Oxford, he also made a single List A one-day appearance for the Combined Universities cricket team in the 1983 Benson & Hedges Cup.

References

External links

1958 births
Living people
People from Ealing
Alumni of Christ Church, Oxford
English cricketers
Oxford University cricketers
British Universities cricketers